Vaigai College of Engineering was established in the year 2012. It is a technical institution offering undergraduate programs in various disciplines of engineering. The college is situated at about 25 km from Madurai and 5 km from Melur. The college is supported by Vaigai Educational Trust.

Departments
The academic departments of the college are:

Civil Engineering
Computer Science and Engineering
Electronics and Communication Engineering
Electrical and Electronics Engineering
Mechanical Engineering

Undergraduate courses (4 years) 
Bachelor of Engineering degree in 
Civil Engineering
Computer Science and Engineering,
Electronics and Communication Engineering,
Electrical and Electronics Engineering,
Mechanical Engineering

References

External links 
 

Engineering colleges in Tamil Nadu
Colleges in Madurai
Engineering colleges in Madurai
Science and technology in Madurai